Vadu Moldovei is a commune located in Suceava County, Western Moldavia, Romania. It is composed of eight villages: Cămârzani, Ciumulești, Dumbrăvița, Ioneasa, Mesteceni, Movileni, Nigotești, and Vadu Moldovei. It included four other villages until 2003, when these were split off to form Fântâna Mare Commune.

References 

Communes in Suceava County
Localities in Western Moldavia